East Grinstead was a parliamentary constituency in the Kingdom of England, the Kingdom of Great Britain, and the United Kingdom. It first existed as a Parliamentary borough from 1307, returning two Members of Parliament to the House of Commons elected by the bloc vote system. The borough was disfranchised under the Reform Act 1832, but the name was revived at the 1885 election when the Redistribution of Seats Act created a new single-member county division of the same name.

Upon its abolition for the 1983 election, its territory was divided between Mid Sussex and Wealden.

Boundaries
1885–1918: The Sessional Divisions of Cuckfield (except the parish of Crawley), East Grinstead, and Uckfield (except the parishes of East Heathley and Waldron).

1918–1950: The Urban Districts of Burgess Hill, Cuckfield, East Grinstead, Hayward's Heath, and Uckfield, and the Rural Districts of Cuckfield, East Grinstead, and Uckfield.

1950–1955: The Urban Districts of Cuckfield and East Grinstead, the Rural District of Uckfield, in the Rural District of Cuckfield the parishes of Ardingly, Balcombe, Bolney, Cuckfield Rural, Horsted Keynes, Lindfield Rural, Slaugham, West Hoathly, and Worth, and in the Rural District of Battle the parishes of Burwash, Etchingham, and Ticehurst.

1955–1974: As 1950 less the Battle RD parishes.

1974–1983: The Urban District of East Grinstead, and the Rural District of Uckfield.

Members of Parliament

MPs 1307–1660

MPs 1660–1832 

Constituency abolished (1832)

MPs 1885–1983 
Constituency revived (1885)

Elections

Elections in the 1880s

Elections in the 1890s

Elections in the 1900s

Elections in the 1910s 

General Election 1914–15:

Another General Election was required to take place before the end of 1915. The political parties had been making preparations for an election to take place and by the July 1914, the following candidates had been selected; 
Unionist: Henry Cautley
Liberal: Richard Arthur Austen-Leigh

Elections in the 1920s

Elections in the 1930s 

Liberal candidate Lewis R. Jones withdrew at the last minute.

General Election 1939–40:
Another General Election was required to take place before the end of 1940. The political parties had been making preparations for an election to take place and by the Autumn of 1939, the following candidates had been selected; 
Conservative: Ralph Clarke
Liberal: William Cavendish Searle

Elections in the 1940s

Elections in the 1950s

Elections in the 1960s

Elections in the 1970s

References

Election results, 1950 - 1979

Further reading

Parliamentary constituencies in South East England (historic)
Constituencies of the Parliament of the United Kingdom established in 1307
Constituencies of the Parliament of the United Kingdom disestablished in 1832
Constituencies of the Parliament of the United Kingdom established in 1885
Constituencies of the Parliament of the United Kingdom disestablished in 1983
Rotten boroughs
East Grinstead